Chrysotypus is a genus of moths of the family Thyrididae.

Type species: Chrysotypus dives  Butler 1879

Species
Some species of this genus are:
Chrysotypus animula  Viette 1957
Chrysotypus caryophyllae  Frappa 1954
Chrysotypus circumfuscus  Whalley 1971
Chrysotypus cupreus  Kenrick 1913
Chrysotypus circumfuscus Whalley, 1971
Chrysotypus dawsoni  Distant 1897
Chrysotypus dives  Butler 1879
Chrysotypus enigmaticus  Whalley 1977
Chrysotypus lakato  Viette 1958
Chrysotypus locuples  Mabille 1879
Chrysotypus luteofuscus  Whalley 1971
Chrysotypus maculatus  Viette 1960
Chrysotypus medjensis (Holland, 1920)
Chrysotypus perineti  Viette 1957
Chrysotypus phoebus  Viette 1960 
Chrysotypus quadratus  Whalley 1971 
Chrysotypus reticulatus  Whalley 1971 
Chrysotypus splendida  Warren 1899 
Chrysotypus subflavus  Whalley 1971 
Chrysotypus tessellata  Warren 1908 
Chrysotypus vittiferalis  Gaede 1917

References

Thyrididae
Moth genera